Okeover is an English surname.  It may refer to:

People
the Walker-Okeover baronets
Okeover Longcroft (1850–1871), an English cricketer.

Locations
Okeover, Staffordshire, a civil parish in East Staffordshire, England.
Okeover Hall, a country house in Staffordshire, England, that is the family seat of the Okeover family
the Okeover homestead, built by Alfred Richard Creyke, now owned by the University of Canterbury
Okeover Inlet, formerly Okeover Arm, the upper end of Malaspina Inlet in the Sunshine Coast region of British Columbia, Canada
Okeover Arm Provincial Park, a provincial park of British Columbia, Canada, located on Okever Inlet
Okeover Community Garden, a community garden at the University of Canterbury, New Zealand